Maria João Gonçalves Abreu Soares (Lisboa, 14 April 1964 – Almada, 13 May 2021), known as Maria João Abreu, was a Portuguese film, television and stage actress. Her most notable works include Portuguese TV series Médico de Família, Aqui Não Há Quem Viva, Golpe de Sorte, and her strong presence in the typical Portuguese genre of "teatro de revista". She was famous for her uplifting roles, mostly associated with humour.

Biography
Maria João Abreu was born in Lisboa on 14 April 1964.

Between 1985 and 2008, she was married to fellow actor José Raposo, with whom she had two sons: Miguel Raposo and Ricardo Raposo. Despite the divorce, the two willingly worked together in several productions and remained good friends.  She married musician João Soares in September 2012.

In November 2020, she tested positive for COVID-19, but recovered.  Her father, who already had lung cancer, died of the disease.

On 30 April 2021, after fainting during the recording of episodes of the Portuguese telenovela A Serra, she was admitted to Hospital Garcia de Orta, in Almada, where she was diagnosed with a ruptured brain aneurysm and put into an induced coma. After multiple surgeries and complications, Abreu died on 13 May 2021, aged 57.

Television

Cinema 

 Amo-te Teresa (2000), by Ricardo Espírito Santo and Cristina Boavida 
 Telefona-me! (2000), by Frederico Corado
 Call Girl (2007), by António-Pedro Vasconcelos
 A Mãe é que Sabe (2016), by Nuno Rocha
 Submissão (2019), by Leonardo António

References

20th-century Portuguese actresses
Portuguese stage actresses
Portuguese television actresses
Portuguese film actresses
1964 births
2021 deaths
Actresses from Lisbon
Neurological disease deaths in Portugal
Deaths from intracranial aneurysm